Karl Wilhelm Andreas Strehl (April 30, 1864 – June 14, 1940) was a German physicist, author and mathematician. He is notable for the Strehl ratio, a widely used measurement for the optical quality of an imaging system.

See also 
 Strehl ratio

References 

1864 births
1940 deaths
20th-century German physicists
German male writers
19th-century German mathematicians
20th-century German mathematicians
19th-century German physicists